Ficarra may refer to:

People
 Glenn Ficarra – American writer, producer, actor and director
 John Ficarra (born ca. 1956) – American publishing figure
 Marie Ficarra (born 1954) – Australian politician

Other
 Ficarra – comune (municipality) in Sicily
 Ficarra e Picone – Italian comedy duo, composed by Salvatore Ficarra and Valentino Picone